Coleophora hackmani is a moth of the family Coleophoridae. It is found from northern Europe to the eastern part of the Palearctic realm. It has also been recorded from the Iberian Peninsula.

The wingspan is 12–15 mm.

The larvae feed on Silene nutans.

External links
Swedish Moths
Fauna Europaea

hackmani
Moths described in 1953
Moths of Europe
Moths of Asia